The Barnesville Depot is a historic site in Barnesville, Georgia. It was added to the National Register of Historic Places on April 30, 1986. It is located at Plaza Way and Main Street. The station was constructed in 1912 for the Central of Georgia Railway. It is located at the junction of the Central's former Macon-Atlanta mainline and its branch to Thomaston, Georgia. The building includes Spanish or Mission architecture (red roof tile, tall chimney pots, and curvilinear gables) and replaced an earlier stone depot constructed in 1852 by the Macon & Western Railroad. It is now used as an arts center.

The last train was the Central of Georgia's Nancy Hanks. The Louisville and Nashville Railroad's Dixie Limited also made a stop there.

See also
National Register of Historic Places listings in Lamar County, Georgia

References

External links
 

Railway stations on the National Register of Historic Places in Georgia (U.S. state)
Railway stations in the United States opened in 1912
National Register of Historic Places in Lamar County, Georgia
Former Central of Georgia Railway stations
Railway stations in Lamar County, Georgia
Transportation in Lamar County, Georgia
Former railway stations in Georgia (U.S. state)